Events from the year 1895 in Scotland.

Incumbents 

 Secretary for Scotland and Keeper of the Great Seal – Sir George Trevelyan, Bt, to 29 June; then Lord Balfour of Burleigh

Law officers 
 Lord Advocate – John Blair Balfour until July; then Sir Charles Pearson
 Solicitor General for Scotland – Thomas Shaw; then Andrew Murray

Judiciary 
 Lord President of the Court of Session and Lord Justice General – Lord Robertson
 Lord Justice Clerk – Lord Kingsburgh

Events 
 11 February – the lowest ever UK temperature of -27.2 °C (measured as -17 °F) is recorded at Braemar in Aberdeenshire. (This UK Weather Record is equalled in 1982 and again in 1995.)
 11 April – electric light is introduced in Edinburgh.
 13 April – first cremation in Scotland's first crematorium, at Glasgow's Western Necropolis.
 July–August – second "Race to the North": Operators of the East and West Coast Main Line railways accelerate their services between London and Aberdeen.
 28 October
 The Daily Record newspaper is first published.
 Probable date of the first car shipped into Scotland, a Panhard for Glasgow engineer George Johnston.
 Percy Pilcher flies in several versions of his hang glider Bat at Cardross, Argyll, the first person to make repeated heavier-than-air flights in the UK.
 Sule Skerry lighthouse completed.
 New Dunoon Pier built.
 New offices for The Glasgow Herald (now The Lighthouse), designed by John Keppie and worked on by Charles Rennie Mackintosh.
 New premises for Jenners department store in Princes Street, Edinburgh, completed.
 The North British Aluminium Company builds Britain's first aluminium smelting plant on the shore of Loch Ness at Foyers.
 Babcock & Wilcox Ltd establish a manufacturing facility at Renfrew based on the existing Porterfield Foundry.
 Paterson's begin baking oatcakes in Rutherglen.

Births 
 2 March – Hughie Ferguson, footballer (suicide 1930)
 9 March – Isobel Baillie, soprano (died 1983)
 29 March – Anne Redpath, still life painter (died 1965)
 19 May – Charles Sorley, poet (killed in action 1915)
 17 June – George MacLeod, soldier and minister of religion (died 1991)
 16 July – Hay Petrie, character actor (died 1948)
 25 August – R. D. Low, comics writer and editor (died 1980)
 3 October – George Henry Tatham Paton, recipient of the Victoria Cross (killed in action 1917)

Deaths 
 18 June – Lord Colin Campbell, Liberal politician who sat in the House of Commons from 1878 to 1885 and probable adulterer (born 1853)
 22 August – Peter Denny, shipbuilder and owner (born 1821)
 George Thompson, shipowner and politician (born 1804)

See also 
 Timeline of Scottish history
 1895 in the United Kingdom

References 

 
Years of the 19th century in Scotland
Scotland
1890s in Scotland